Raymond Salles (13 September 1899 in Paris – 25 January 1976)  was a philatelist who was a specialist in French maritime mail. He was entered on the Roll of Distinguished Philatelists in 1974.

In 1973, Salles was awarded the Crawford Medal by the Royal Philatelic Society London for Volumes I-VIII of his work Encyclopaedie de la poste maritime Française historique et catalogue.

Selected publications
Encyclopaedie de la poste maritime Française historique et catalogue.

References

French philatelists
1899 births
1976 deaths
Collectors from Paris
Signatories to the Roll of Distinguished Philatelists